Essinger is a surname of German origin, originating as a habitational name for someone from any of the places called Essing or Essingen. Notable people with the surname include:

Anna Essinger (1879-1960), German educator
James Essinger (born 1957), British freelance writer and author

See also
Mount Essinger, a mountain in the Royal Society Range of Victoria Land, Antarctica
Esslinger (disambiguation)